Helen Houston Homans McLean (February 8, 1877 – March 29, 1949) was an American tennis champion.

Career
Homans won the women's doubles title at the 1905 U.S. National Championship and the singles title the next year.

Homans played mixed doubles with Marshall McLean as early as 1902 and later married him a/in New York City in 1907. In mixed doubles, she reached the semifinals partnering Harry F. Allen in 1905.

In 1911, she won three of the New Jersey State championship titles.

In 1913, she regained her title when she defeated Marie Wagner at the Morristown Field Club in Morristown, New Jersey. On September 19, 1913, she was defeated by Clare Cassell at the Montclair Athletic Club.

In 1915, Molla Bjurstedt of Norway, the national indoor champion, defeated McLean in the final round of the Class A tennis singles at the West Side Tennis Club. She finished second in the U.S. National Championships women's doubles with Augusta Bradley Chapman in 1915.

McLean was still ranked fourth in 1913 and third in 1915 in the U.S. national ranking. In 1915, she won the U.S. Indoor Championships.

Personal life
She was married to Marshall McLean (1869–1952), a New York City attorney.

Grand Slam finals

Singles (1 title)

Doubles (1 title, 2 runners-up)

References

External links

American female tennis players
United States National champions (tennis)
1877 births
1949 deaths
Grand Slam (tennis) champions in women's singles
Grand Slam (tennis) champions in women's doubles
Tennis people from New Jersey